Akdurak is a village in the Besni District, Adıyaman Province, Turkey. The village is populated by Kurds of the Reşwan tribe and had a population of 636 in 2021.

The hamlets of Çakmak, Dağdibi, Güvercin, Kömkışla, Kurugöl and Türünkışla are attached to Akdurak.

References

Villages in Besni District

Kurdish settlements in Adıyaman Province